A virtual business (short: virtubis) employs electronic means to transact business as opposed to a traditional brick and mortar business that relies on face-to-face transactions with physical documents and physical currency or credit.

History
Amazon.com was a virtual business (short: virtubis) pioneer. As an online bookstore, it delivered and brokered bookstore services without a physical retail store presence; efficiently connecting buyers and sellers without the overhead of a brick-and-mortar location. As Web 2.0 services have risen in popularity, many businesses have begun to use these communicative and collaborative technologies to reach their customers. With heightened security, PCI DSS compliance regulations, and more stringent monitoring abilities, credit card transactions via the Internet are even more secure than other options such as phone or fax. Along with connecting customers with physical products, virtual businesses are starting to provide important services as well. Recently, the online delivery of professional services such as administration, design, and marketing services have risen in popularity. Such companies have refined their offerings to include services such as a Virtual Assistant, in which the person providing the service works out of his/her own office and provides services via the Internet or other technology.

Physical–virtual blending
Most brick-and-mortar companies reduce costs and increase market share by engaging in e-commerce via web sites and by leveraging their existing telecommunications infrastructure. In addition to sales and customer relations, such e-commerce may also include:
Collaborating with suppliers and competitors.
Outsourcing many of the business functions like marketing, operations management and new product development,
Remote work

Virtual worlds
Some virtual businesses operate solely in a virtual world. Environments such as Second Life have enough economical activity to be viable for commerce and one can make a living from sales of virtual property, products and services to virtual customers in these virtual worlds.

Virtual corporations
In the USA groups of people can assemble online and enter into an agreement to work together toward a for-profit goal, with or without having to formally incorporate or form a traditional company. A virtual corporation (S corporation or LLC) may be required to maintain a registered agent with a physical address but it can be started, operated and terminated without any of the principals ever being in each other's physical presence. Global Healthcare Marketing and Communications, LLC (Global HMC) is an example of a virtual corporation operating worldwide sans bricks or mortar. The company provides medical education services to major pharmaceutical companies and the business model differs significantly from traditional medical education agencies with a physical presence.

Virtual enterprise
A virtual enterprise is a network of independent companies—suppliers, customers, competitors, linked by information technology to share skills, costs, and access to each other's markets. Such organizations are usually formed on the basis of a cooperative agreement with little or no hierarchy or vertical integration. This flexible structure minimizes the impact of the agreement on the participants' individual organizations and facilitates adding new participants with new skills and resources. Such arrangements are usually temporary and dissolve once a common goal is achieved. A virtual enterprise is rarely associated with an independent legal corporation or brick-and-mortar identity of its own.

See also
Distributed development
Virtual community of practice
Virtual management
Virtual office
Virtual team
Virtual volunteering

References

Business terms